The Indian Love Lyrics is a 1923 British silent romantic drama film directed by Sinclair Hill and starring Catherine Calvert, Owen Nares and Malvina Longfellow. It is based on the poem The Garden of Kama by Laurence Hope. The film's sets were designed by art director Walter Murton.

In India, a princess disguises herself as a commoner to escape an arranged marriage.

Cast
 Catherine Calvert as Queen Vashti 
 Owen Nares as Prince Zahindin  
 Malvina Longfellow as Princess Nadira  
 Shayle Gardner as Ahmed Khan  
 Fred Raynham as Ibrahim-bey-Israel  
 Roy Travers as Hassan Ali Khan  
 William Parry as Mustapha Khan  
 William Ramsey as Sultan Abdul Rahin 
 Daisy Campbell as Sultana Manavour 
 Fred Rains as Selim  
 Pino Conti as Youssef 
 Arthur McLaglen as Champion

References

Bibliography
 Low, Rachael. History of the British Film, 1918-1929. George Allen & Unwin, 1971.

External links

1923 films
1923 romantic drama films
British silent feature films
British romantic drama films
Films directed by Sinclair Hill
Stoll Pictures films
Films shot at Cricklewood Studios
British black-and-white films
1920s English-language films
1920s British films
Silent romantic drama films